Pedro Emmanuel Ojeda (born 5 November 1997) is an Argentine professional footballer who plays as a midfielder for Universidad de Chile.

Career

Club
Ojeda started with Rosario Central. He was promoted into their first-team squad in May 2016 as a substitute for an Argentine Primera División match with Quilmes, though went unused during a 1–1 draw. Five months later, in October, Ojeda made his professional debut in an away tie versus Huracán; which was one of three appearances in 2016–17.

In June 2022, he moved out of Argentina and joined Universidad de Chile.

International
Ojeda represented the Argentina U20s at the 2017 South American U-20 Championship in Ecuador, winning two caps (against Peru and Uruguay) as his nation finished fourth place. A year previous, he was selected for the 2016 COTIF Tournament; featuring four times.

Career statistics
.

Honours
Rosario Central
 Copa Argentina: 2017–18

References

External links

1997 births
Living people
People from Goya
Argentine footballers
Argentine expatriate footballers
Argentina youth international footballers
Argentina under-20 international footballers
Association football midfielders
Argentine Primera División players
Rosario Central footballers
Chilean Primera División players
Universidad de Chile footballers
Expatriate footballers in Chile
Argentine expatriate sportspeople in Chile
Sportspeople from Corrientes Province